The RACV Credit Union was a credit union based in suburban Victoria, Australia that merged with Big Sky Credit Union in 2005. Membership of the credit union was open to staff and families of current and former employees of the Royal Automobile Club of Victoria and to Club Members of the organisation.

The credit union was formed in 1972

The credit union had cash handling facilities at its head office within the RACV service Headquarters in Noble Park.

In 1978, the credit union was part of a training program for Swinburne College. "Under college supervision, students worked as a team to produce a useful programme for the RACV Credit Union."

In 2005 the RACV Credit Union's members voted to transfer their business to the Big Sky Credit Union. At the time it had 2,364 members. The transfer of engagements contributed $12.1 million to Big Sky's assets and $1.6 million to member equity.

References

External links
 Bigsky Credit Union Annual Report 2006
Wayback machine archive of RACV Credit Union credit union pages between 2002 and 2006

Credit unions of Australia
Banks established in 1972
1972 establishments in Australia